Rinaldo Louis Williams (December 18, 1893 in Santa Cruz, California – April 24, 1966 in Cottonwood, Arizona) was an American professional baseball player who played third base for four games in Major League Baseball in 1914, for the Brooklyn Tip-Tops of the Federal League.

Sources

Major League Baseball third basemen
Baseball players from California
Brooklyn Tip-Tops players
1893 births
1966 deaths
San Francisco Seals (baseball) managers
San Francisco Seals (baseball) players
Vallejo Marines players
Watsonville Pippins players
St. Joseph Drummers players
Rockford Wakes players
Milwaukee Brewers (minor league) players
Fort Worth Panthers players
Memphis Chickasaws players
Mobile Bears players
Dallas Steers players
Nashville Vols players
Shreveport Sports players